Brendan James Penny (born November 9, 1978) is a Canadian film and television actor who first became well known to TV audiences as A.J. Varland in the first season of Whistler that aired in Canada from 2006 to 2008. He is perhaps best known as Detective Brian Lucas in Motive, a Canadian crime drama centred on a team of Vancouver homicide detectives, also starring Kristin Lehman, Louis Ferreira and Lauren Holly, which aired from 2013 to 2016. Brendan currently stars as Kevin O'Brien in the Hallmark Channel family drama series Chesapeake Shores, which premiered on August 14, 2016. He has also been the hero of a number of Hallmark originals.

Early life and his career
Penny was born November 9, 1978, in Ottawa, Ontario, and grew up in both Ottawa and London. He attended Fanshawe College, London, Ontario, earning a BS in Accounting. He later attended the Lyric School of Acting, in Vancouver, British Columbia, where he had moved in 2002 to pursue an acting career. After several television roles, he became known to audiences for playing A.J. Varland in Whistler.

Penny has had various roles in television series such as Kyle XY and Supernatural. His first lead role was in Whistler. His roles include shows such as Diamonds, Smallville, Blade: The Series, and The L Word. Penny starred in The Assistants and appeared as Sean in I Love You, Beth Cooper. In a main cast role, he played Detective Brian Lucas in Motive.

Filmography

Awards and nominations

References

External links
 

Living people
Canadian male film actors
Canadian male television actors
Male actors from Ottawa
21st-century Canadian male actors
1978 births